Compliments may refer to:
 Compliments (album), an album by Jerry Garcia
 Compliments (Band of Horses song)
 Compliments (Bloc Party song)
 Compliments, a private label brand sold by Sobeys

See also
 Compliments slip